The 1968 Nobel Peace Prize was awarded to the French jurist René Cassin (1887–1976) "for his struggle to ensure the rights of man as stipulated in the UN Declaration." He is the ninth French recipient of the peace prize.

Laureate

After experiencing the horrors of the World War I and ending up becoming a severely wounded soldier, René Cassin discovered the very value and dignity of human life. Inspired, he represented France at the League of Nations during the inter-war years, and worked for disarmament. In the 1920s, Cassin sought to bring reconciliation between former enemies, and declared that military veterans were especially well equipped to bring about reconciliation and peace. Hence, he supported war veteran's efforts in peace conferences. After World War II, he was assigned to the United Nations to help draft the 1948 Universal Declaration of Human Rights together with P. C. Chang, Charles Malik and Eleanor Roosevelt. During the drafting process, he contributed much in the its revisions, expansions and improvements until it was accepted by the General Assembly during its third session on 10 December 1948. He later became the president of the European Court of Human Rights in 1965 to 1968, after which, through his lifelong efforts to ensure universal human rights, the Norwegian Nobel Committee recognized him.

Deliberations

Nominations
René Cassin was nominated only in three occasions: in 1949 by 1937 Nobel laureate Robert Cecil, 1st Viscount Cecil of Chelwood, in 1950 by American lawyer Manley Ottmer Hudson and in 1968 by French law professor Georges Vedel.

In total, the Norwegian Nobel Committee earned 78 nominations for 34 individuals and 14 organizations such Vinoba Bhave, Hermann Gmeiner, Danilo Dolci, U Thant, Cyrus S. Eaton and the Universal Esperanto Association. Seventeen of the nominees were newly nominated such as Norman Borlaug (awarded in 1970), Halvard Lange, John S. Knight, Alfonso García Robles (awarded in 1982), Frans Hemerijckx, Vicenç Ferrer Moncho, Ernst Bloch, René Maheu, John Collins, the World Health Organization (WHO), the World Council of Churches (WCW) and the UNESCO. The British philanthropist Sue Ryder was the only female nominee. Notable figures like Otto Hahn (awarded the 1944 Nobel Prize in Chemistry), Joseph Kentenich, Muriel Lester, Thomas Merton, Georgios Papandreou, Amparo Poch y Gascón, Gabrielle Radziwill and Pitirim Sorokin died in 1968 without having been nominated for the peace prize.

References

External links

1965